Nicolas Bézy (born 26 September 1989) is a French rugby union footballer. He plays at scrum-half and fly-half for Provence Rugby.  Nicolas Bézy was a member of the Stade Toulousain team that won the 2010-11 Top 14. He is the older brother of fellow half-back Sébastien Bézy, who currently plays for ASM Clermont Auvergne in the Top 14.

References

External links
LNR Profile

1989 births
Living people
Rugby union scrum-halves
Stade Toulousain players
French rugby union players
Sportspeople from Hauts-de-Seine
Stade Français players
FC Grenoble players
CA Brive players
Provence Rugby players